Barney Williams may refer to:

Barney Williams (actor) (1824–1876), Irish-American star comedian in New York City
Barney Williams (boxer) (1891–1949), American light heavyweight champion a/k/a Battling Levinsky
Barney Williams (songwriter) (1931–2009), American record producer and singer a/k/a Luther Dixon
Barney Williams (rower) (born 1977), Canadian Olympic medalist

See also
Bernard Williams (disambiguation)